The Solon people are a subgroup of the Ewenki (Evenk) people of northeastern Asia. They live in China's Inner Mongolia Autonomous Region and Heilongjiang Province, and constitute the majority of China's Ewenki.

Terminology and classification

The Ewenki (also spelled Evenki) people are spread throughout the taiga forests of much of northeastern Asia, including most of Eastern Siberia and parts of Northeastern China. According to Juha Janhunen's  classification, the Ewenki people found in China can be classified into three subethnic groups: 
 The Solon ("Solon Ewenki")
 The Oroqen
 The "Manchurian Reindeer Tungus" - a small group which are known to the Chinese as the "Yakut" ("Yakut Ewenki"). They are the only group in China engaged in reindeer herding.

Another subethnic group in China's Inner Mongolia, the  Khamnigan are bilingual, speaking the Ewenki language along with a  Mongolian dialect. Janhunen believes that their primary ethnic affiliation is Mongolian  rather than Ewenki, and does not include them into his classification of China's Ewenki.

The above classification is different from the PRC's official classification, according to which the Oroqen are considered a separate ethnic group, while the official Ewenki ethnic group of China includes not only the Solons and the "Manchurian Reindeer Tungus", but also  the Khamnigan (or, officially, the "Tungus Ewenki").

As both the "Manchurian Reindeer Tungus" and the Khamnigans are quite small groups (perhaps around 200 persons in the former, and under 2,000 in the latter,  as of the 1990s), the majority of the people classified as "Ewenki" in China are Solons.  The Solon population was estimated as  7,200 in 1957,  18,000 in 1982, and 25,000 in 1990.

According to Janhunen's analysis, the Oroqen are in fact much closer to the "Ewenki proper" (i.e., the Evenks of Siberia) than the Solon are. The Solon are characterized by their close association with the Daur people. The Solons reside in the same areas where Daur do, in particular, in Evenk Autonomous Banner of Inner Mongolia, and elsewhere throughout the prefecture-level city of Hulunbuir.  While the Solon language itself is a dialect of the Evenki language, most of the Solons are also bilingual in the Mongolic Daur language.

History

The Albazinians were told to marry Solon Evenki widows by the Board of Rites.

The Solons were ordered by the Qianlong emperor to stop using rifles and instead practice traditional archery issuing an edict for silver taels to be issued for guns to be turned over to the government:

In Xinjiang
In 1763, a number of Solon bannermen, along with their Daur and Xibe comrades-in-arms were resettled from Manchuria (Northeastern China) to the frontier regions of the recently conquered Xinjiang (see Dzungar–Qing Wars). These Solon became also known as the "Ongkor Solon". The presence of the Solons in the region is attested in numerous Russian accounts, in particular from the time of the Muslim minorities' war and its aftermath.

Unlike Xinjiang's Xibe, who preserve their ethnic identity into the 21st century, the less numerous Solon settlers gradually assimilated to the Dagur and Xibe. While over 100 Solons still lived in Xinjiang in 1905–1908, less than 20 people identified as Solon in the region in 1991. In 1990, only one Solon speaker remained in Xinjiang; he was 79 years old.

Shamanism 

There are few sources on the shamanism of the Ewenki peoples below the Amur/Helongkiang river in Northern China. There is a brief report of fieldwork conducted by Richard Noll and Kun Shi in 1994 of the life of the shamaness Dula'r (Ewenki name), also known as Ao Yun Hua (her Han Chinese name). She was born in 1920 and was living in the village of Yiming Gatsa in the Ewenki Banner (county) of the Hulunbuir Prefecture, in the Inner Mongolian Autonomous Region. While not a particularly good informant, she described her initiatory illness, her multiyear apprenticeship with a Mongol shaman before being allowed to heal at the age of 25 or 26, and the torments she experienced during the Cultural Revolution in the 1960s when most of her shamanic paraphernalia was destroyed. Mongol and Buddhist Lamaist influences on her indigenous practice of shamansim was evident. She hid her prize possession—an Abagaldi (bear spirit) shaman mask, which has also been documented among the Mongol and Daur peoples in the region. The field report and color photographs of this shaman are available online.

Language

According to Janhunen's research, the numerous dialects of the Ewenki language can be divided into two major groups: those of the Solons (which he labels "Solon Ewenki") and those of the Ewenki of Siberia (as well as the Oroqen and the "Manchurian Reindeer Tungus" of China), which he calls "Siberian Evenki". The Ewenki dialects of the bilingual Khamnigan show features characteristic of both "Manchurian" and "Siberian" groups, as well as peculiar Khamnigan innovations.

The Solon being closely associated with the Daur, many (around half of them, according to Janhunen's field research in the 1990s) Solon people are bilingual in the Daur language.  During the Qing Empire, many Solon (as well as members of many other native groups of Manchuria) were able to speak Manchu, while in modern China Mandarin Chinese is universally taught.

See also
 Solun, Horqin Right Front Banner
 Qing Regulation of Solon Gun Ownership, by David Porter, Harvard University

Notes

References
 

  

Tungusic peoples
Ethnic groups in China
Evenks